Fishlake National Forest is a U.S. National Forest located in south central Utah.  The namesake for the forest is Fish Lake, the largest freshwater mountain lake in the state.

Wildlife
Animals that inhabit this forest are elk, shrews, deer, black bears, coyotes, various species of bats, moose, raccoons, two species of skunks, badgers, turkey vultures, two species of eagles, pika, snowshoe hares, various species of woodpeckers, pine marten, porcupines, four species of hummingbirds, beavers, kestrels, pronghorn, various species of owls, bobcats, minks, three species of fox, cougars, mountain lions, bighorn sheep, wild turkeys, and mountain goats.

Geography
The forest lies in parts of nine counties. In descending order of forestland area, they are Sevier, Millard, Piute, Beaver, Wayne, Juab, Garfield, Iron, and Sanpete counties. Forest headquarters are located in Richfield with local ranger district offices in Beaver, Fillmore, Loa, and Richfield. The national forest is the headwaters of Otter Creek, a tributary of the East Fork Sevier River.

Pando, a clonal quaking aspen stand, that, according to some sources, is the oldest (80,000 years) and largest (106 acres, 13 million pounds) organism on Earth, is located in the Fremont River Ranger District of the National Forest, 1 mile southwest of Fish Lake on Utah route 25.

Acquisition
Native water rights to Fish Lake were sold to the Fremont Irrigation Company on March 10, 1889, for nine horses, 500 pounds of flour, one steer, and a suit of clothes.  Ten years later President William McKinley created a Forest Reserve which included Fish Lake.

Gallery

See also
List of U.S. national forests
Fish Lake, Utah
Fishlake Scenic Byway

References

External links

 Fishlake National Forest - USDA Forest Service
 Fishlake National Forest - Utah Office of Tourism

 
1908 establishments in Utah